The North University Park Historic District is a historic district in the North University Park neighborhood of Los Angeles, California.  The district is bounded by West Adams Boulevard on the north, Magnolia Avenue on the west, Hoover Street on the east, and 28th Street on the south.  The district contains numerous well-preserved Victorian houses dating back as far as 1880.  In 2004, the district was added to the National Register of Historic Places.

History
The North University Park area was subdivided between 1885 and 1901.  The Miller and Herriott House, which is still standing, is believed to have been a model house used by the developers to attract potential buyers.  The area boomed further when the street cars from downtown reached the area in 1891.  In 1892, the widow of Gen. John C. Fremont, Jessie Benton Fremont, was living in the district at 1107 West 28th Street; she remained in the house until 1902.  The district was also the birthplace of Adlai Stevenson, who was born in the house at 2639 Monmouth Avenue in 1900.

Homes within the district

Many of the homes within the district are noteworthy, including the following:
 House at 2633 S Hoover St.—This transitional Craftsman/Shingle style house was designed by Thomas Preston and built in approximately 1900.  There is also an original carriage house at the rear of the property.
 William W. Cockins House, 2653 S. Hoover St.—This Queen Anne Victorian house was designed by Bradbeer & Ferris and built in 1894.  It is a visual landmark on Hoover Street and is considered one of the most impressive examples of late Queen Anne style architecture in Los Angeles. Now owned by the University of Southern California, it currently functions as the USC Mrs. T.H. Chan Division of Occupational Science and Occupational Therapy's Center for Occupation and Lifestyle Redesign.
 Alfred J. Salisbury House, 2703 S. Hoover St. (pictured in Infobox above)—This Queen Anne Victorian house was designed by Bradbeer & Ferris and built in approximately 1891.  The detailed craftsmanship make it an outstanding example of Queen Anne architecture.  In 1897, it became the Cumnock School of Oratory, though it was later converted back into a residence.  It is considered one of the finest Victorian homes in Los Angeles and was named a Los Angeles Historic Cultural Monument (HCM #240) in 1981.
 Maria Antonia Arguella Wilcox House, 1100 w. Adams Blvd.—This Spanish Colonial Revival-style house was reportedly designed by architect, Frederick Roehrig in approximately 1899.  It later became the Sisters of the Company of Mary Convent.
 A.E. Kelly Residence, 1140 W. Adams Blvd.—This Queen Anne Victorian house was depicted in the 1896 edition of "Comfortable Los Angeles Homes" compiled by the Brown Heating Co.

 Robert E. Ibbetson House, 1190 W.Adams Blvd.—This two-story residence has been described as an eclectic mix of Victorian and Richardsonian Romanesque styles.  Its asymmetrical design includes by a two-story tower.  The home was designed and built in approximately 1899 by its owner, Robert E. Ibbetson.
 Miller and Herriott House - This Eastlake Victorian house is itself separately listed on the National Register of Historic Places and has also been designated as a Los Angeles Historic Cultural Monument (HCM #242).
 House at 1120 W. 27th St.—This Queen Anne Victorian house was designed by Bradbeer & Ferris and was built in approximately 1894.
 De Pauw Residence, 1146 W. 27th St. - This Queen Anne Victorian was built in 1897 by James Bradbeer of Bradbeer & Ferris for philanthropist Mrs. Francis W. De Pauw.  It came to be called The Stephens House as future governor William Stephens lived there in the 1910s.  Its gable was destroyed by a fire in 1952, and never rebuilt.
 John C. Harrison House, 1160 W. 27th St. — This Queen Anne Victorian house is estimated to have been built in 1891.
 House at 1186 W. 27th St. — This Craftsman bungalow was built in 1909 and designed by Arthur S. Heineman.
 Mary E. Smith House, 1186 W. 27th St. — This transitional Craftsman - Victorian house was designed architect, John C. Austin, and built in 1906. It has been designated as HCM #798.
 John H. Kiefer Residence — This French-influenced Victorian house was designed by Eisen & Hunt and built in 1895.
 House at 2671 Magnolia Ave. — This Classical Revival house was designed by Frederick Roehrig and built in 1894.
 Adlai Stevenson Birthplace — Adlai E. Stevenson was born in a house located at 2639 Monmouth Avenue on February 5, 1900.  The house was designed by C.W. Wedgewood and built in approximately 1894.  When Stevenson died in 1965, the site of his birthplace was declared a Los Angeles Historic Cultural Monument (HCM #35).

Gallery of houses

See also
 List of Registered Historic Places in Los Angeles

References

Historic districts in Los Angeles
National Register of Historic Places in Los Angeles
South Los Angeles
West Adams, Los Angeles
Historic districts on the National Register of Historic Places in California